Malice in Wonderland is the only studio album by Paice Ashton Lord.  It was released in 1977.

Track listing
All songs written by Ian Paice, Tony Ashton and Jon Lord, except where noted.

Original release
"Ghost Story" — 5:47
"Remember the Good Times" (Ian Paice, Tony Ashton, Jon Lord, Bernie Marsden, Paul Martinez) — 5:48
"Arabella (Oh Tell Me)" (Tony Ashton) — 4:06
"Silas & Jerome" — 3:25
"Dance with Me Baby" (Ian Paice, Tony Ashton, Jon Lord, Bernie Marsden, Paul Martinez) — 3:20
"On the Road Again, Again" (Ian Paice, Tony Ashton, Jon Lord, Bernie Marsden) — 3:58
"Sneaky Private Lee" (Ian Paice, Tony Ashton, Jon Lord, Bernie Marsden) — 6:10
"I'm Gonna Stop Drinking" — 5:15
"Malice in Wonderland" — 6:06

1995 CD version
The 1995 CD release includes three extra live tracks:
"Ghost Story" - recorded at the Odeon, Birmingham 
"Steamroller Blues" (James Taylor), recorded at the Rainbow, London 
"Ballad of Mr. Giver" (Tony Ashton, Jon Lord), recorded at Rainbow, London

2001 CD version
The 2001 reissue on Purple Records includes eight additional tracks from PAL's unfinished second album:
"Steamroller Blues"
"Nasty Clavinet"
"Black and White"
"Moonburn"
"Dance Coming"
"Goodbye Hello LA"
"Untitled Two"
"Ballad of Mr. Giver" 

2019 CD version
The 2019 reissue on earMUSIC includes eight additional tracks from PAL's unfinished second album, remastered in 2019. It includes an additional 24-page-booklet with new liner notes by Simon Robinson and previously unseen photos by Alan Messer:
"Steamroller Blues"
"Nasty Clavinet"
"Black and White"
"Moonburn"
"Dance Coming"
"Goodbye Hello LA"
"Untitled Two"
"Ballad of Mr. Giver" 

2019 2LP version
The 2019 vinyl reissue on earMUSIC includes eight additional tracks from PAL's unfinished second album, on 2 LPs, remastered in 2019. It includes new liner notes by Simon Robinson and previously unseen photos by Alan Messer:
SIDE A
"Ghost Story"
"Remember the Good Times"
"Arabella (Oh Tell Me)"
"Silas & Jerome"
"Dance with Me Baby"
SIDE B
"On the Road Again, Again"
"Sneaky Private Lee"
"I'm Gonna Stop Drinking"
"Malice in Wonderland"
SIDE C
"Steamroller Blues"
"Nasty Clavinet"
"Black and White"
"Moonburn"
SIDE D
"Dance Coming"
"Goodbye Hello LA"
"Untitled Two"
"Ballad of Mr. Giver"

Personnel
Ian Paice - drums, percussion
Tony Ashton - vocals, keyboards
Jon Lord - keyboards, synthesizer
Paul Martinez - bass
Bernie Marsden - guitar, backing vocals
The McKinleys - backing vocals
Howie Casey, Reg Brooks, Gilbert Dall’anese - horns
Technical
Martin Birch - engineer

References

1977 debut albums
Paice Ashton Lord albums
Albums produced by Martin Birch
Polydor Records albums
Warner Records albums